Edmodo was an educational technology platform for K12 schools and teachers. Edmodo enabled teachers to share content, distribute quizzes and assignments, and manage communication with students, colleagues, and parents. It was shut down on September 22, 2022.

History
Edmodo.id was founded by Nick Borg, Ed O'Neil, Jeff O'Hara, and Crystal Hutter in 2008. It was backed by Index Ventures, Benchmark, Greylock Partners, New Enterprise Associates, Union Square Ventures, Tenaya Capital, SingTel, and KDDI.

In 2013, Edmodo.id was included in the list of "The Top Apps for teachers" by PC Magazine. The same year, Edmodo launched a startup, Root-1, in an effort to establish itself as the app store for education. Vibhu Mittal, co-founder and CEO of Root-1, became the CEO of Edmodo the following year.

In 2014, Edmodo launched Snapshot – a suite of assessment tools to measure student progress on educational standards. The company also partnered with Oxford University Press and Cambridge University Press to provide access to educational content on the Edmodo Platform and bring Edmodo Snapshot to the UK.

In January 2017, Edmodo launched professional development courses for teachers in the state of New York in conjunction with NYPTI. These included both a synchronous video classroom component as well as an asynchronous, text based discussion component.

On May 17, 2017, Edmodo sent an email informing users that it was the victim of a major hack of user information. Some 77 million users' data were breached: this included the username, hashed password and email address (in a subset of the cases, since not all users need an email address to register). Since passwords were both hashed and salted (encrypted) using the bcrypt algorithm, the effort to decrypt all the passwords would have been very large. There were no reports of any school data being affected, nor any identities compromised, according to an external audit commissioned by the company.

In June 2017, Edmodo announced Ask Mo, an educational video search engine. Ask Mo's search algorithm is based on videos that had been shared by teachers in the context of educational discussions and can be filtered by subject and grade level.

On April 8, 2018, Edmodo announced that it was being acquired by NetDragon for $137.5 million in cash and stock.

In July 2019, Edmodo claimed to have over 100 million users worldwide.

On August 15, 2022, Edmodo announced that the platform would be closed on September 22, 2022.

References

American educational websites
Classroom management software
Internet properties established in 2008
Privately held companies based in California
Android (operating system) software
Companies based in San Mateo, California
2008 establishments in California
Educational technology companies of the United States
IOS software